William John Dalzell Burnyeat MA (13 March 1874 – 8 May 1916) was a British Liberal Party politician.

Background
He was the eldest son of William Burnyeat and Sarah Frances Dalzell, of Moresby, Cumberland. He was educated at Rugby School, Corpus Christi College, Oxford (Exhibitioner). He married in 1908, Hildegard Retzlaff of Friedenau, Berlin. She was considered a risk under the Defence of the Realm Act during WW1 and interned. On Burnyeat's death in May 1916 she was released.

Career
He was Called to the bar, Inner Temple in 1899 and practised on the Northern Circuit. He served as Liberal MP for Whitehaven from 1906–10. Standing for the first time, he gained the seat from the Conservative at the 1906 General Election. He served just one full parliamentary term and chose not to defend his seat at the January 1910 General Election. He did not stand for parliament again. He was a Justice of the Peace.

Sources
Who Was Who
British parliamentary election results 1885–1918, Craig, F. W. S.

References

External links 

Who Was Who

1874 births
1916 deaths
Liberal Party (UK) MPs for English constituencies
UK MPs 1906–1910
People educated at Rugby School
Alumni of Corpus Christi College, Oxford
Members of the Inner Temple